Adaora Ukoh is a Nollywood actress and an entrepreneur who has featured in movies including Thy Kingdom Come, Black Bra and Lekki Wives. She is the host of Divas Dynasty and the CEO of Adaora couture for over-sized women. She also spoke out when the Chibok girls went missing.

Biography 
Ada was born on 27 April in Anambra state. She attended St. John college and studied law at the University of Lagos.

She entered the Nollywood industry at the age of 16 in 2004, starring  in Evil Genius. Subsequently, she played different roles in films. In Lekki wives, she featured as Miranda.  Her roles are limited due to her big size but she thinks her shape is a gift and blessing. Adaora had to go bald in the movie Thy Kingdom Come when she acted as a widow.

Filmography 
 Evil Genius
 Thy Kingdom Come
 Lekki Wives
 Black Bra
 Karishika
 Bora
 Blood Money

Personal life 
The actress is married to Basil Eriofolor and had a son who came out after some hours in the labour room.

References 

Living people
1990s births
Year of birth uncertain
21st-century Nigerian actresses
Nigerian film actresses
University of Lagos alumni
Igbo actresses
Nigerian television presenters
Nigerian television personalities
Nigerian film producers
Nigerian women film producers
Nigerian businesspeople
Nigerian women in business
Nigerian chief executives
Actresses from Anambra State
20th-century Nigerian actresses